Abdurahman Fakhro (Arabic:عبد الرحمن فخرو) (born 19 September 1992) is a Qatari footballer .

References

External links
 

Qatari footballers
1992 births
Living people
Al-Wakrah SC players
Mesaimeer SC players
Qatar Stars League players
Qatari Second Division players
Place of birth missing (living people)
Association football defenders